Black Bird is an American crime drama miniseries developed by Dennis Lehane, based on the 2010 autobiographical novel In with the Devil: a Fallen Hero, a Serial Killer, and a Dangerous Bargain for Redemption by James Keene with Hillel Levin. The six-episode miniseries premiered on July 8, 2022, on Apple TV+. The series received critical acclaim with particular praise toward Jimmy Keene's original story and its cast.

Cast

Main
 Taron Egerton as James "Jimmy" Keene Jr., accused of drug and weapons conspiracy facing a 10-year prison sentence without a chance for parole. 
 Paul Walter Hauser as Lawrence "Larry" Hall, a convicted serial killer and rapist accused of murdering 14 women
 Sepideh Moafi as Lauren McCauley, an FBI agent and Jimmy's handler
 Greg Kinnear as Brian Miller, a police detective from Wabash investigating Larry's missing murder victims
 Ray Liotta as James "Big Jim" Keene, Jimmy's father

Recurring
 Robyn Malcolm as Sammy Keene
 Jake McLaughlin as Gary Hall, Larry's brother
 Robert Wisdom as Edmund Beaumont, McCauley's superior at the FBI
 Cullen Moss as Russ Aborn
 Tony Amendola as Vincent Gigante, the mob boss of the Genovese Family
 Melanie Nicholls-King as Dr. Amelia Hackett
 Christopher B. Duncan as Dr. Aaron Zicherman
 Joe Williamson as CO Carter, a prison guard who knows Jimmy
 Laney Stiebing as Jessica Roach
 Cecilia Leal as Rochelle
 Cade Tropeano as young Larry Hall
 Blue Clarke as young Jimmy Keene
 Kwajalyn Brown as Judge Diane Wood

Plot
James 'Jimmy' Keene was a promising young football star who was offered several college football scholarships; instead he decided to stay in the Chicago area to be close to his thriving business. He turned to a life of crime dealing narcotics until he was arrested as part of a wider sting called Operation Snowplow. He accepted a plea deal which he believed to be five years, released with parole after four years. However, in addition to his drug conspiracy, he was charged with possession of a number of illegally held firearms and was sentenced to ten years without parole.

Given Jimmy's natural charming and charismatic personality and gift for talking, he was offered an opportunity for a  fully commuted sentence with no conditions by federal authorities. This is the story of the dangerous deal he was offered and what happened next.

Episodes

Production 
The series was announced in January 2021, with Taron Egerton and Paul Walter Hauser cast to star. Ray Liotta would be added to the cast in March, with Greg Kinnear and Sepideh Moafi joining the next month. The six-episode limited series premiered on July 8, 2022, on Apple TV+.

Production for the series began in New Orleans in April 2021.

Reception

Critical response
The review aggregator website Rotten Tomatoes reported a 97% approval rating with an average rating of 8.2/10, based on 79 critic reviews. The website's critics consensus reads, "Dennis Lehane's penchant for authentic grit is on full display in Blackbird, an absorbing prison drama distinguished by its moral complexity and elevated by an outstanding ensemble." Metacritic, which uses a weighted average, assigned a score of 80 out of 100 based on 29 critics, indicating "generally favorable reviews".

Mike Hale of The New York Times stated, "Despite that imbalance in the dramatic weight, Black Bird is mostly engaging — Hauser is onscreen a lot, and the production has a hushed quality, with occasional expressionistic touches, that is reminiscent of David Fincher’s crime stories. It’s at its best in the fourth episode, directed by Jim McKay (“Our Song”): Egerton is more relaxed, and Hauser even sharper than usual, and their scenes together have an almost sexual charge. And McKay’s depictions of a prison riot and the subsequent cleanup, meticulously supervised by Hall, are among the show’s best moments." Brian Tallerico of RogerEbert.com gave the series 3.5 stars out of 4, commenting, "Its release in the era of a national obsession with true crime could lead people to dismiss Black Bird, but this show is worth your time even if you don’t usually buy into the genre. It reminded me more of rich, character-driven material like The Night Of than so many of the 'ripped from the headlines' mini-series of late. It has the weight of some of Lehane’s best fiction, even though it’s all so disturbingly true." Daniel Fienberg of The Hollywood Reporter wrote, "Black Bird gains a tremendous amount of gravity from one of Liotta’s last screen appearances. Liotta’s death brings additional poignancy to a character who, through failing health and visits to his incarcerated son, is dealing with his own mortality and legacy... Black Bird is methodical (though not as methodical as Mindhunter) in a way that gains power as the show goes along... There’s enough good drama here to make that worthwhile."

Accolades

References

External links
 
 

2020s American drama television miniseries
2022 American television series debuts 
2022 American television series endings
American prison television series
Apple TV+ original programming
English-language television shows
Television shows based on American novels
Television shows filmed in New Orleans